Farina is a village in Fayette and Marion counties, Illinois,  United States. The population was 540 at the 2020 census. It is the only community with the name "Farina" in the United States.

History
Farina was founded in 1867. The community was named after farina (food), from its location in the wheat-growing district.

Geography
Farina's limits extend southwest along Illinois Route 37 into Marion County. Interstate 57 passes through the northwest corner of the village at Exit 135, leading northeast  to Effingham and southwest  to Salem. Illinois Route 37 passes through the enter of Farina and runs parallel to I-57. Illinois Route 185 leads northwest  to Vandalia, the Fayette County seat.

The village is located at the headwaters of the East Fork of the Kaskaskia River, which drains the village to the southwest.

Demographics

As of the census of 2000, there were 558 people, 237 households, and 147 families residing in the village. The racial makeup of the village was 99.28% White, 0.36% Native American, and 0.36% from two or more races. Hispanic or Latino of any race were 0.18% of the population.

There were 237 households, out of which 25.7% had children under the age of 18 living with them, 50.6% were married couples living together, 8.0% had a female householder with no husband present, and 37.6% were non-families. 34.6% of all households were made up of individuals, and 19.0% had someone living alone who was 65 years of age or older.  The average household size was 2.28 and the average family size was 2.96.

In the village, the population was spread out, with 22.6% under the age of 18, 7.0% from 18 to 24, 22.6% from 25 to 44, 25.8% from 45 to 64, and 22.0% who were 65 years of age or older.  The median age was 43 years. For every 100 females, there were 86.6 males.  For every 100 females age 18 and over, there were 87.0 males.

The median income for a household in the village was $31,406, and the median income for a family was $41,875. Males had a median income of $27,917 versus $19,886 for females. The per capita income for the village was $17,068.  About 6.2% of families and 10.8% of the population were below the poverty line, including 10.7% of those under age 18 and 17.2% of those age 65 or over.

References

Villages in Fayette County, Illinois
Villages in Illinois